Alexander Gunn (October 5, 1828 – September 26, 1907) was a Scottish grocery wholesaler who immigrated to Canada and was elected to the House of Commons of Canada in the 1878 election defeating incumbent Leader of the Opposition Sir John A. Macdonald. He was re-elected in 1882 then lost in 1887 and again in 1891 to Macdonald.

In 1864, he married Angelique Agnes Matthews, daughter of Robert Matthews and Angelique Valliere of Quebec. They had four sons and two daughters, their descendants include various Canadian and British military and diplomatic figures.

External links
 

1828 births
1907 deaths
Liberal Party of Canada MPs
Members of the House of Commons of Canada from Ontario
Scottish emigrants to Canada